Allanblackia ulugurensis is a species of flowering plant in the family Clusiaceae. It is found only in Tanzania. Its seeds produce an edible oil, which can be extracted by pounding, boiling, and skimming off the fat.

References

ulugurensis
Endemic flora of Tanzania
Vulnerable plants
Taxonomy articles created by Polbot
Oil seeds